Satyrium ilicis, the ilex hairstreak, is a butterfly of the family Lycaenidae.

Distribution and habitat
This species is present in Southern and Central Europe, in South Western Siberia, in Asia Minor, Caucasus, Transcaucasia, Lebanon and Southern Urals. It inhabits woods up to 1600 m in elevation.

Description

Satyrium ilicis has a wingspan of 32–36 mm. The basic color of the wings is brownish. In the females the upperside of the forewings usually shows large patches of orange, while on the underside of the hindwings there are orange black bordered lunules. A series of irregular broken white markings are present on the underside of the forewings and hindwings. On the hindwings are present two short tails. Larvae are pale green, about 2 cm long.

Biology
It is a univoltine species. Adults fly from Late May to Early August. Caterpillars feed on oaks (especially Quercus robur, Quercus coccifera, Quercus ilex, Quercus petraea, Quercus pubescens), elms (Ulmus species), Rhamnus cathartica and Prunus.  Larvae are attended by ants Camponotus aethiops and Crematogaster species.

References

External links

 Lepiforum

Satyrium (butterfly)
Butterflies described in 1779
Butterflies of Europe